Moonbeam Creek is a stream in Thompson-Nicola Regional District in the Interior region of British Columbia, Canada. It is in the Pacific Ocean drainage basin and is a left tributary of the North Thompson River.

Course
The creek begins at an unnamed slope to the southwest of the peak of Dominion Mountain, part of the Monashee Mountains. The North Thompson River flows via the Thompson River and the Fraser River to the Pacific Ocean.

References

Rivers of British Columbia
Kamloops Division Yale Land District